The 2021 Colorado mid-air collision occurred on approach to Centennial Airport near Denver, Colorado, on 12 May 2021.

Events
At about 10:20 AM local time, Key Lime Air Flight 970, an air charter cargo flight from Salida, Colorado, operated by a Swearingen SA226-TC Metroliner, collided in mid-air with a Cirrus SR22 light aircraft over Cherry Creek State Park in Arapahoe County. The collision destroyed a large section of the cabin of the Metroliner and damaged the empennage, but the pilot—who was the sole aircraft occupant and, based on communications with air traffic control, was initially unaware of the extent of the damage—was able to make a safe landing at Centennial Airport despite the significant damage to the fuselage and subsequent failure of the right-hand engine. The pilot of the Cirrus, which was a private rental aircraft on a local flight from Centennial Airport, deployed the Cirrus Airframe Parachute System (CAPS) and made a safe parachute-assisted forced landing near Cherry Creek Reservoir; the pilot and single passenger were not injured.  The accident is under investigation by the US National Transportation Safety Board (NTSB) and Federal Aviation Administration (FAA). It was covered heavily by local and national media outlets due in part to the lack of fatalities or injuries to the parties involved, a rare outcome in a midair collision. Aviation news site AVweb dubbed the incident "the Centennial Miracle".

References

2021 in Colorado
Airliner accidents and incidents in Colorado
Aviation accidents and incidents in the United States in 2021
Mid-air collisions
Mid-air collisions involving general aviation aircraft
Arapahoe County, Colorado
May 2021 events in the United States
Accidents and incidents involving the Fairchild Swearingen Metroliner